The Legacy Center, originally known as the Health and Human Performance Education Complex (or H&HP Complex), is a multi-purpose arena in Lake Charles, Louisiana, on the campus of McNeese State University across the street from the Jack V. Doland Athletic Complex.  The  facility includes six classrooms, 12 faculty offices, a lab, a sports training center, an arena seating around 4,200 for basketball and other events as well as a volleyball court with seating for 600.  Crawford Architects and Randy M Goodloe AIA, APAC were the project architectural firms, and the general contractor was Alfred Palma, LLC.

Renaming
On August 4, 2021, McNeese announced that the arena had been renamed The Legacy Center after Lake Charles couple David and Kimberly Griffin pledged $2.5 million in donations over 10 years. The "Legacy" name reflects the Griffins' ownership of local retailer Legacy Jewelers, as well as the name of their farm, Legacy Fields.

See also
List of NCAA Division I basketball arenas

References

Basketball venues in Louisiana
Buildings and structures in Lake Charles, Louisiana
College basketball venues in the United States
Indoor arenas in Louisiana
McNeese Cowboys basketball
McNeese Cowgirls basketball
Sports venues in Lake Charles, Louisiana
Tourist attractions in Calcasieu Parish, Louisiana
2018 establishments in Louisiana
Sports venues completed in 2018